Robert William Raba (born April 23, 1955) is a former American football tight end in the National Football League for the New York Jets, the Baltimore Colts, and the Washington Redskins.  He played college football at the University of Maryland.

1955 births
Living people
American football tight ends
New York Jets players
Baltimore Colts players
Washington Redskins players
People from Washington, D.C.
Maryland Terrapins football players